Rodney Martin may refer to:
 Rodney Martin (sprinter) (born 1982), American sprinter 
 Rodney Martin (squash player) (born 1965), Australian squash player
 Rodney O. Martin, Jr. (born 1951/1952), American business executive